Serendipity is an unplanned fortunate discovery. Serendipity is a common occurrence throughout the history of product invention and scientific discovery.

Etymology
The first noted use of "serendipity" was by Horace Walpole on 28 January 1754. In a letter he wrote to his friend Horace Mann, Walpole explained an unexpected discovery he had made about a lost painting of Bianca Cappello by Giorgio Vasari by reference to a Persian fairy tale, The Three Princes of Serendip. The princes, he told his correspondent, were "always making discoveries, by accidents and sagacity, of things which they were not in quest of." The name comes from Serendip, an old Persian name for Sri Lanka (Ceylon), hence Sarandib by Arab traders. It is derived from the Sanskrit Siṃhaladvīpaḥ (Siṃhalaḥ, Sri Lanka + dvīpaḥ, island).

The word has been exported into many other languages, with the general meaning of "unexpected discovery" or "fortunate chance".

Applications

Inventions 

The term "serendipity" is often applied to inventions made by chance rather than intent. Andrew Smith, editor of The Oxford Companion to American Food and Drink, has speculated that most everyday products had serendipitous roots, with many early ones related to animals. The origin of cheese, for example, possibly originated in the nomad practice of storing milk in the stomach of a dead camel that was attached to the saddle of a live one, thereby mixing rennet from the stomach with the milk stored within.

Other examples of serendipity in inventions include:
 The Post-It Note, which emerged after 3M scientist Spencer Silver produced a weak adhesive,  and a colleague used it to keep bookmarks in place on a church hymnal.
 Silly Putty, which came from a failed attempt at synthetic rubber.
 The use of sensors to prevent automobile air bags from killing children, which came from a chair developed by the MIT Media Lab for a Penn and Teller magic show.
 The microwave oven. Raytheon scientist Percy Spencer first patented the idea behind it after noticing that emissions from radar equipment had melted the candy in his pocket.
 The Velcro hook-and-loop fastener. George de Mestral came up with the idea after a bird hunting trip when he viewed cockleburs stuck to his pants under a microscope and saw that each burr was covered with tiny hooks.
 The Popsicle, whose origins go back to San Francisco where Frank Epperson, age 11, accidentally left a mix of water and soda powder outside to freeze overnight.
 Polymer teflon, which Roy J. Plunkett observed forming a white mass inside a pressure bottle during an effort to make a new CFCs refrigerant. 
The antibiotic penicillin, which was discovered by Sir Alexander Fleming after returning from a vacation to find that a Petri dish containing staphylococcus culture had been infected by a Penicillium mold, and no bacteria grew near it.
The effect on humans of the psychedelic lysergic acid diethylamide (LSD) was discovered by Swiss chemist Albert Hofmann in 1943, after unintentionally ingesting an unknown amount, possibly absorbing it through his skin.

Discoveries 

Serendipity contributed to entomologist Shaun Winterton discovering Semachrysa jade, a new species of lacewing, which he found not in its native Malaysia, but on the photo-sharing site Flickr. Winterton's discovery was aided by Flickr's ability to present images that are personalized to a user's interests, thereby increasing the odds he would chance upon the photo. Computer scientist Jaime Teevan has argued that serendipitous discovery is promoted by such personalisation, writing that "people don't know what to do with random new information. Instead, we want information that is at the fringe of what we already know, because that is when we have the cognitive structures to make sense of the new ideas."

Online activity 
Serendipity is a design principle for online activity that would present viewpoints that diverge from those participants already hold. Harvard Law professor Cass Sunstein argues that such an "architecture of serendipity" would promote a healthier democracy. Like a great city or university, "a well-functioning information market" provides exposure to new ideas, people, and ways of life. "Serendipity is crucial because it expands your horizons. You need that if you want to be free." The idea has potential application in the design of social media, information searches, and web browsing.

Related terms
Several uncommonly used terms have been derived from the concept and name of serendipity.

William Boyd coined the term zemblanity in the late twentieth century to mean somewhat the opposite of serendipity: "making unhappy, unlucky and expected discoveries occurring by design". The derivation is speculative, but believed to be from Nova Zembla, a barren archipelago once the site of Russian nuclear testing.

Bahramdipity is derived directly from Bahram Gur as characterized in The Three Princes of Serendip.  It describes the suppression of serendipitous discoveries or research results by powerful individuals.

In addition, Solomon & Bronstein (2018) further distinguish between perceptual and realised pseudo-serendipity and nemorinity.

See also
 Browse
 Coincidence
 Felix culpa
 Insight
 Lateral thinking
 Multiple discovery
 Role of chance in scientific discoveries
 Serendipaceratops
 Serendipity Sapphire
 Side effect
 Synchronicity

References

Further reading
 (Manuscript written 1958).

Isabelle Rivoal and Noel B. Salazar (2013). Contemporary ethnographic practice and the value of serendipity, Social Anthropology, 21(2): 178–85.

External links

 ACM Paper on Creating serendipitous encounters in a geographically distributed community.
 The Serendipity Equations
 Serendipity of Science – a BBC Radio 4 series by Simon Singh
     Video: Are Scientific Discoveries Merely Lucky Shots?, Samantha Copeland, Delft University of Technology

Philosophy of science
Synchronicity
Scientific method
Inventions
Luck